The women's 400 metres event at the 2020 Summer Olympics took place from 3 to 6 August 2021 at the Japan National Stadium. 45 athletes from 34 nations competed. Shaunae Miller-Uibo won the gold medal in a personal best of 48.36 secs, a time which ranks her sixth on the world all-time list. In successfully defending her title, Miller-Uibo joined Marie-Jose Perec as the only women to win two Olympic 400 metres titles.

Summary
Returning from Rio was Gold Medalist Shaunae Miller-Uibo, remembered for her diving finish to beat Allyson Felix. Felix was back as well, now age 35 and a mother, running in her fifth Olympics. Each time she sets a season best, it is a masters world record. But the list of non-participants is notable; World Champion Salwa Eid Naser suspended a little over a month before the Olympics due to three whereabouts failures; Olympic and World Championship bronze medalist Shericka Jackson, who focused her season on the shorter sprints, netting a bronze medal in the 100 metres; Namibian teenage sensations Beatrice Masilingi, number one in 2020 and Christine Mboma who ran the #7 time in history the same day Eid Naser was suspended, both were barred from running 400 or 800 due to the new Testosterone regulations. Both ran in the 200 metres, Mboma taking silver. Another teenager, NCAA Champion Athing Mu, chose to focus her efforts on the 800 metres, netting a gold medal.

It took sub-50 in the semi-finals just to get into the final. Marileidy Paulino was the fastest qualifier at 49.34, her Dominican National Record, putting her in the center of the track, lane 5 for the final. The Jamaicans Stephenie Ann McPherson and Candice McLeod in 6 and 4 respectively, were the fastest around the first turn, with Felix, blind to her competitors in lane 9, also getting out well. Roxana Gómez pulled up after 100 m.  Coming off her poor performance in the 200 final, Miller-Uibo ran conservatively in the first 200 metres, still keeping in close contact with Felix well within her view from lane 7. Towards the end of the first straight, Jodie Williams moved up to join McPherson's early pace in lane 8. Through the final turn, Miller-Uibo and Paulino began to assert themselves, with Miller-Uibo advancing to a 2 metre lead coming off the turn. Behind her, Felix, Williams, McPherson and Paulino were all in a row to battle for the medals. Down the final straight, Paulino clearly pulled away, but was too far back to chase down Miller-Uibo who kept increasing her lead. Williams fell back but McPherson and Felix battled until Felix pulled ahead half way towards home.

Miller-Uibo joined Marie-José Pérec as the only women to successfully defend the Olympic 400 metres title. She improved her personal best, which was the #6 time in history and the North American Continental Record. Paulino set her second national record of the competition, moving her to #20 of all time. This season she improved her personal best by 2.68 seconds. Felix nabbed her tenth Olympic medal, breaking a tie with Merlene Ottey as the most of any woman in athletics and set her third Masters World Record of the season.

Background
This was the 15th time the event was held, having appeared at every Olympics since 1964.

Qualification

A National Olympic Committee (NOC) could enter up to 3 qualified athletes in the women's 400 metres event if all athletes meet the entry standard or qualify by ranking during the qualifying period. (The limit of 3 has been in place since the 1930 Olympic Congress.) The qualifying standard is 51.35 seconds. This standard was "set for the sole purpose of qualifying athletes with exceptional performances unable to qualify through the IAAF World Rankings pathway." The world rankings, based on the average of the best five results for the athlete over the qualifying period and weighted by the importance of the meet, will then be used to qualify athletes until the cap of 48 is reached.

The qualifying period was originally from 1 May 2019 to 29 June 2020. Due to the COVID-19 pandemic, the period was suspended from 6 April 2020 to 30 November 2020, with the end date extended to 29 June 2021. The world rankings period start date was also changed from 1 May 2019 to 30 June 2020; athletes who had met the qualifying standard during that time were still qualified, but those using world rankings would not be able to count performances during that time. The qualifying time standards could be obtained in various meets during the given period that have the approval of the IAAF. Both indoor and outdoor meets were eligible for qualifying. The most recent Area Championships may be counted in the ranking, even if not during the qualifying period.

NOCs can also use their universality place—each NOC can enter one female athlete regardless of time if they had no female athletes meeting the entry standard for an athletics event—in the 400 metres.

Competition format
The event continued to use the three-round format introduced in 2012.

Records
Prior to this competition, the existing world and Olympic records were as follows.

Schedule
All times are Japan Standard Time (UTC+9)

The women's 400 metres took place over three separate days.

Results

Round 1 
Qualification rule: first three finishers of each heat (Q) plus the next six fastest times (q) qualify to the semifinals.

Heat 1

Heat 2

Heat 3

Heat 4

Heat 5

Heat 6

Semifinals 
Qualification rule: first two finishers of each heat (Q) plus the next two fastest times (q) qualify to the final.

Semifinal 1

Semifinal 2

Semifinal 3

Final

References

Women's 400 metres
2020
Women's events at the 2020 Summer Olympics
Olympics